David Burn (c.1799 – 14 June 1875) was a Tasmanian pioneer and dramatist, author of the first Australian drama to be performed on stage, The Bushrangers.


Early life
Burn was born in Scotland, the son of David Burn and his wife, Jacobina, née Hunter (1763–1851). David Burn senior died c.1820 and Jacobina emigrated to Van Diemen's Land (now Tasmania) and became the first woman there to have land granted to her. David junior had a brief career in the navy joined his mother in Van Diemen's Land in 1826. He failed to qualify for a land grant returned to Edinburgh in 1829, divorcing his wife there.

Career
On 8 and 10 September 1829 Burn's play, The Bushrangers, was acted at the Caledonian Theatre, Edinburgh, with success. Early in January 1830 his farce, Manias and Maniacs (afterwards renamed Our First Lieutenant) was played at the same theatre for several successive nights. In 1830 Burn returned to Van Diemen's Land and revisited England with his mother in 1836. He remained until 1840; the dedication of his pamphlet Vindication of Van Diemen's Land is dated 18 February 1840, and in 1841 he brought out another pamphlet, The Chivalry of the Mercantile Marine, published at Plymouth. He contributed a serial in the Colonial Magazine of 1840-1841, Van Diemen's Land, which has been reprinted in book form in 1973 as A Picture of Van Diemen's Land. Burn published a pamphlet Vindication of Van Diemen's Land in A Cursory Glance at Her Colonists as They Are, Not as They Have Been Represented To Be (London, 1840).

Burn returned to Van Diemen's Land and published his Plays and Fugitive Pieces in Verse in 1841; the dedication to Lady Franklin is dated November 1842. This book, in two well-printed volumes bound in one, was the first volume of plays published in Australia. In 1842 he visited Port Arthur penal colony and its cemetery, Isle of the Dead. Around this time he probably wrote his An Excursion to Port Arthur in 1842, of which an edition was published at the Examiner office, Launceston, some 60 years later. Burn accompanied Sir John and Lady Jane Franklin on their expedition to the west coast of Tasmania in 1842 which was described in his Narrative of the Overland Journey … From Hobart Town to Macquarie Harbour, 1842 (published in Sydney 1955 with notes by G. Mackaness).
Burn was editing the South Britain or Tasmanian Literary Journal in 1843, and afterwards went to Sydney and Auckland, where he lived for many years. He was connected with the New Zealand press, at first on the New Zealander and later as a partner in the New Zealand Herald.

Death and legacy
Burn died in prosperous circumstances at Auckland on 14 June 1875, he had two children and was married twice. He was a prodigious writer and many of his manuscripts are preserved at the Mitchell library, Sydney, including his reminiscences and diaries. He was also author of Van Diemen's Land, Moral, Physical and Political, and Strictures on the Navy.

References

D. H. Borchardt, 'Burn, David (1799 - 1875)', Australian Dictionary of Biography, Volume 1, MUP, 1966, pp 181–182.

A Picture of Van Diemen's Land, David Burn, 1973, Cat & Fiddle Press.

1799 births
1875 deaths
Australian male dramatists and playwrights
Australian people of Scottish descent
19th-century Australian dramatists and playwrights